Falsochrobactrum  is a genus of bacteria from the family of Brucellaceae.

References

Hyphomicrobiales
Bacteria genera